Juraj Kuráň (born 11 August 1988) is a Slovak football midfielder.

References

External links
 at eurofotbal.cz 
 at imscouting.com

1988 births
Living people
Slovak footballers
Association football midfielders
FC Senec players
ŠK Slovan Bratislava players
FC Petržalka players
FC ViOn Zlaté Moravce players
FC DAC 1904 Dunajská Streda players
Slovak Super Liga players